Saint Michael of Chernigov or Mikhail Vsevolodovich ( – Saray, 20 September 1246) was a Rus' prince (a member of the Rurik dynasty). He was grand prince of Kiev (now Kyiv), 1236–1240, 1240, 1241–1243); and he was also prince of Pereyaslavl (1206), of Novgorod-Seversk (1219–1226), of Chernigov (1223–1235, 1242–1246), of Novgorod (1225–1226, 1229–1230), and of Halych (1235–1236).

Archaeological evidence reveals that Chernihiv towns enjoyed an unprecedented degree of prosperity during his period which suggests that promoting trade was a priority for him. Commercial interests, in part, also motivated him to seize control of Halych and Kiev because they were channels through which goods from the Rhine valley and Hungary passed to Chernihiv (Ukraine). He also negotiated commercial treaties and political alliances with the Poles and the Hungarians.

He alleviated the tax burden of the Novgorodians and granted their boyars greater political freedom from the prince. He was the last autonomous senior prince of Kiev, where he was deposed not by a more powerful prince but by the invincible Mongols.

On the eve of Mongol invasion, he was one of the most powerful princes in Rus'. He has been accused of ineffective leadership because he failed to unite the princes of Rus' against the invaders; in his defense it must be pointed out that this was an impossible task.

Mikhail was the first prince of the Olgovichi (the dynasty of Chernigov) to become a martyr according to the commonly understood meaning of the word: he underwent the penalty of death for persistence in his Christian faith. He and his boyar Fedor (Theodore) were tortured and beheaded by the Tatars.

They later became known as "The Passion-Sufferers of Chernigov" and "The Miracle-Workers of Chernigov".

Early life
He was the only known son of prince Vsevolod Svyatoslavich (who later became grand prince Vsevolod IV the Red of Kiev), by Anastasia, the daughter of grand duke Casimir II of Poland. The patrimonial domain of his father was located in the northwestern part of the Vyatichi lands where he undoubtedly spent his childhood.

When Mikhail was a child, he suffered from a paralyzing illness. His grandfather, grand prince Svyatoslav III Vsevolodovich of Kiev gave much wealth to churches in unsuccessful attempts to obtain a cure. Finally, he heard of the miracle-worker Nikita living in the Monastery of St. Nicetas at Pereyaslavl-Zalessky in Suzdalia. The prince, accompanied by boyars, rode to the town and arrived at the monk's pillar. The stylite gave his staff to one of his boyars to take to the prince; Mikhail took hold of it, was cured, and walked to the miracle-worker's pillar for his blessing. Following his cure, he gave a generous benefaction to the monastery and ordered a stone cross to be erected, according to one source on 16 May 1186, on the spot where he was cured. Although the event is reported only in late sources and embellished with pious details, the account has a ring of truth.

In the summer of 1206, his father seized Kiev, sent his posadniki to all the Kievan towns, and forced grand prince Rurik Rostislavich to withdraw to Vruchiy (today Ovruch in Ukraine). Vsevolod Svyatoslavich also evicted Yaroslav Vsevolodovich (son of grand prince Vsevolod Yuryevich of Vladimir) from Pereyaslavl, and gave the town to Mikhail. However, Rurik Rostislavich was determined to regain control of Kiev, and expelled Vsevolod Svyatoslavich with relative ease. Rurik Rostislavich also ordered Mikhail, who had only a small retinue at his disposal, to vacate Pereyaslavl, and thus he withdrew to his father in Chernihiv. Some time in the summer of 1207, his father occupied again Kiev, but in October, Rurik Rostislavich rode to Kiev, drove out Vsevolod Svyatoslavich for the second time and occupied the town; Mikhail accompanied his father from Kiev.

No sources report Mikhail's marriage, but evidence suggests that he married Elena Romanovna (or Maria Romanovna), a daughter of prince Roman Mstislavich of Halych in 1210 or 1211.

In June 1212, prince Mstislav Romanovich of Smolensk, prince Mstislav Mstislavich the Bold of Novgorod and prince Ingvar Yaroslavich of Lutsk launched a major offensive against Vsevolod Svyatoslavich who confronted the attackers at Vyshgorod. However, the Rostislavichi occupied Kiev. Vsevolod Svyatoslavich fled from Kiev, probably accompanied by Mikhail, for the third time and sought safety in Chernihiv where he died sometime in August 1212. Mikhail probably inherited Bryn, Serensk, and Mosalsk from his father.

When his uncle Gleb Svyatoslavich died between 1215 and 1220, and Mstislav II Svyatoslavich moved to Chernihiv, Mikhail, because of his status as the second in seniority, probably occupied Novgorod-Seversk.

In the spring of 1223, a strong Mongol cavalry corps under the command of Jebe and Subutai which had been sent by Genghis Khan to reconnoiter the "western lands" entered the land of the Cumans. Unable to withstand the onslaught, the Cumans fled to Rus' warning the princes that if they refused to send aid the same fate would befall them. At the war council of the Rus' princes it was decided not to wait for the coming of the Tatars but to attack them deep in the Cuman steppes. Mikhail also attended the meeting. The united forces of the princes went down the river Dnieper, and the first skirmish took place on the banks of the river. In this vanguard battle Mstislav Mstislavich the Bold succeeded in defeating a detachment of Mongol troops.

Crossing the Dnieper, their armies marched through the steppes for 8 days before they met the main Mongol force at the banks of the Kalka River. There was no unity of command in the Russian army. The results were disastrous: most princes, including Mstislav II Svyatoslavich of Chernigov, perished during the fight.

Prince of Chernigov and Novgorod

Mikhail was probably among the first survivors who returned to Chernihiv. The chronicles do not tell us that Mikhail replaced Mstislav II Svyatoslavich as prince of Chernigov, but later evidence reveals that after his uncle's demise he sat on the throne of his father and grandfather in the Holy Saviour Cathedral. The ceremony probably took place around 16 June. Because princes of his generation predeceased him and had no heirs, Mikhail, in his capacity as senior prince, assumed control over a number of their domains. This accumulation of territories made him the largest landowner in the land.

At that time, the Novgorodians acknowledged grand prince Yuri II Vsevolodovich of Vladimir as their overlord, but they frequently challenged his appointment of princes. In 1224, his son, Vsevolod Yuryevich had to flee from Novgorod. It appears that Mikhail was already in Vladimir on the Klyazma when Yuri Vsevolodovich learnt of his son's flight. Yuri Vsevolodovich threatened the Novgorodians to attack; in response, they confirmed their loyalty to him but made a pact to die in the defense of the Cathedral of St. Sofia. Yuri Vsevolodovich, therefore, proposed that they accept Mikhail as prince. The Novgorodians agreed and, in March 1225, Mikhail occupied Novgorod. Nevertheless, Yuri Vsevolodovich demanded the sum of 7,000 novuyu as a fine from the citizens and confiscated their goods.

Mikhail went to Novgorod, where he acted as Yuri Vsevolodovich's appointee and not as an autonomous ruler, with the intention of returning to Chernihiv. One of his most important tasks was to recover the Novgorodians' wares that Yuri Vsevolodovich had confiscated at Torzhok and in his own domain. Before departing from Novgorod, Mikhail invited the townsmen to send merchants to Chernihiv and declared that their lands and his would be as one. After he departed from Novgorod, the veche sent its request for a prince to Yuri Vsevolodovich's brother, prince Yaroslav Vsevolodovich of Pereyaslavl Zalesskiy.

About a year after Mikhail returned to Chernihiv, it appears he became involved in a dynastic dispute: Oleg Svyatoslavich of Kursk prepared to wage war on him. The available evidence suggests that the bone of contention was Novhorod-Siverskyi. It is noteworthy that the chroniclers accuse neither Mikhail nor Oleg of wrongdoing which suggests that each had a just cause. During the winter of 1227, Yuri Vsevolodovich, and his nephews (prince Vasilko Konstantinovich of Rostov and prince Vsevolod Konstantinovich of Pereyaslavl) came to help Mikhail against Oleg Svyatoslavich; in addition to them, Metropolitan Kirill I of Kiev also helped to reconcile Mikhail with Oleg who evidently became the prince of Novgorod Seversk.

In 1228, grand prince Vladimir III Rurikovich of Kiev summoned Mikhail and attacked the latter's brother-in-law, prince Daniil Romanovich of Volodymyr, who had seized the towns of Lutsk and Chertoryysk, in Kamenets. However, they failed to take Kamenets whose ability to withstand the siege is all the more impressive because Vladimir III Rurikovich allegedly attacked with all his allies.

In December 1228, the common people of Novgorod rose up in arms against tysyatskiy Vyacheslav and appointed Boris Negochevich in his place, and invited Yaroslav Vsevolodovich to return according to a new agreement. They insisted that he abide by all their terms and by all the laws of Yaroslav the Wise; he also had to cancel the zaboshnitse (a special tax levied on churches which also served as warehouses), and to stop appointing his judges in the Novgorodian lands. On 20 February 1229, therefore, Yaroslav Vsevolodovich's sons (Fedor Yaroslavich and Aleksandr Yaroslavich) fled to their father. The Novgorodians got word to Mikhail, and he set out for Novgorod upon receiving the invitation; he arrived in Novgorod around the beginning of May.

Mikhail and the townsmen introduced measures to waken Yaroslav Vsevolodovich's power: the veche appointed Vnezd Vodovik as the new posadnik and also removed his other administrators. After levying heavy fines on Yaroslav Vsevolodovich's supporters, the Novgorodians used the money for the benefit of the entire community by paying for the construction of a new bridge.

Mikhail's pro-Novgorod legislation included granting the town officials some of the prince's power: he permitted the boyars to appoint their own judges. He also abrogated the zabozhnitse, placed a moratorium on the payment of tribute for five years on those peasants who had fled to other lands and agreed to return to their Novgorodian homes, and lessened the tax burden of the common people. After spending some three months in Novgorod, Mikhail returned home. When he departed from Novgorod, he designated his son Rostislav Mikhailovich to remain as his lieutenant, and on returning to Chernihiv he took with him prominent Novgorodians.

In May 1230 he returned to Novgorod where he installed his son on the throne. Before departing, he promised the Novgorodians to return with troops by 14 September. On 8 December the Novgorodians forced Rostislav Mikhailovich to flee to his father on just the feeble pretext that Mikhail had promised to bring troops by 14 September, but it was already December and he had not come. In this way Yaroslav Vsevolodovich's supporters evicted the Olgovichi from Novgorod, as it turned out, for the last time. They summoned Yaroslav Vsevolodovich and he came on December 30. Meanwhile, a core of dissenters found refuge with Mikhail; to secure his hegemony over Novgorod, therefore, Yaroslav Vsevolodovich had to stop Mikhail from giving them support.

Prince of Chernigov and grand prince of Kiev

In the summer or autumn of 1231, Mikhail waged war against grand prince Vladimir III Rurikovich of Kiev who sent an appeal for help to Daniil Romanovich (Mikhail's brother-in-law). We are told that Daniil Romanovich came and pacified the two princes.

In the autumn of 1231, Yaroslav Vsevolodovich attacked the northwest district of the Vyatichi lands. He set fire to Serensk (which was most likely the administrative center of Mikhail's patrimony), but when he besieged Mosalsk, he failed to take it. Yaroslav, however, refused to conclude peace which signaled to Mikhail that he was prepared to pursue his objective until Mikhail expelled the Novgorodian fugitives from his lands. Towards the end of 1231 Vnezd Vodovik died in Chernihiv; Mikhail had been bound to support Vodovik owing to their mutual oaths, and Vodovik's death released him from that obligation. Therefore, tysyatskiy Boris Negochevich and his band left Chernihiv before Easter of 1232.

In 1232, troops sent by Vladimir III Rurikovich pursued and captured the princes of Bolokhoveni who had invaded Daniil Romanovich's lands and handed them over to the latter. Mikhail and prince Iziaslav Vladimirovich of Putyvl threatened to attack Daniil Romanovich if he refused to release them. Although Vladimir Rurikovich renewed his pact with Daniil Romanovich, Mikhail and Iziaslav Vladimirovich continued waging war against them. In January 1235, Vladimir Rurikovich and Daniil Romanovich attacked Chernihiv, plundered the environs and set fire to the outer town hoping to make Mikhail submit. He, however, promised Daniil Romanovich many gifts if he would desert Vladimir III Rurikovich. Daniil Romanovich agreed and attempted to persuade Vladimir to lift the siege; but Mikhail sallied out of Chernihiv at night, caught Daniil Romanovich's troops by surprise, and killed many of them. His brother-in-law barely escaped and was forced to withdraw to the Kievan land.

Mikhail waited until Iziaslav Vladimirovich brought the Cumans and then rode in pursuit. The two sides clashed near Torchesk where Vladimir Rurikovich and Daniil Romanovich were defeated, and the former and many boyars were also taken captive. Meanwhile, Mikhail's allies took Kiev where he evidently made the German merchants, who had come to Kiev via Novgorod, pay redemption-fees for their goods, and then appointed his puppet, Izyaslav Mstislavich (one of the Rostislavichi) to the throne.

At an undisclosed date after Daniil Romanovich returned to Halych from his defeat at Torchesk, its boyars rebelled and forced him to flee to Hungary. Towards the end of September, Mikhail occupied Halych, while his comrade-in-arms, Izyaslav Vladimirovich seized Kamenets. In the spring of 1236, Mikhail attacked Daniil Romanovich in Volhynia. In addition to his own retinue, he was probably accompanied by Galician boyars, the princes of Bolokhoveni, and troops from the Kievan land. He also sent Izyaslav Vladimirovich to bring the Cumans; and finally, he summoned duke Konrad I of Masovia (his maternal uncle) who had broken off friendly ties with Daniil Romanovich. The size of his attacking force suggests that he intended to capture his brother-in-law's capital of Volodymyr-Volynskyi. However, the Cumans plundered the Galician lands forcing Mikhail to abandon his campaign.

Meanwhile, king Béla IV of Hungary renewed his father's pact with Mikhail, and seemingly relinquished his claim to Halych and also agreed to give Mikhail military aid. At the beginning of the summer of 1236, Daniil Romanovich and his brother Vasilko Romanovich rallied their troops to march against Mikhail. However, he barricaded himself in Halych with his retinue, the local militia, and a contingent of Hungarians. Dissuaded from taking Halych, they sought to assuage their frustration by seizing its northern outpost of Zvenigorod, but its citizens repelled the attack. After the Hungarian troops had departed, Daniil Romanovich tried again; Mikhail attempted to placate his brother-in-law by giving him Przemyśl whose inhabitants had supported him in the past.

Meanwhile, grand prince Yuri II Vsevolodovich of Vladimir and Daniil Romanovich formed a pact, forced Vladimir Ryurikovich, who had replaced Izyaslav Mstislavich, to vacate Kiev, and appointed Yury Vsevolodovich's brother Yaroslav Vsevolodovich to the town. The latter arrived in Kiev around March 1236; but he failed to consolidate his rule and returned to Suzdalia. After appointing his son to rule Halych, Mikhail came to Kiev where he entered uncontested. Soon after occupying Kiev, he and his son attacked Przemyśl and took it back from Daniil Romanovich. The people of Halych, however, summoned Daniil Romanovich around 1237, and installed him as prince; Mikhail's son fled to king Béla IV and all the boyars of Halych submitted to Mikhail's brother-in-law.

The Mongol invasion of Rus'
In the winter of 1237, Batu Khan came to the frontiers of Ryazan; it is possible that Prince Yury Ingvarevich of Ryazan sent his brother, Ingvar Ingvarevich, to Chernihiv to seek help from Mikhail, but he sent no troops to the beleaguered princes. On 21 December the Mongols took Ryazan, and they plundered the treasures of the inhabitants including the wealth of their relatives from Kiev and Chernihiv.

In March 1238 the Mongols, who had routed Yuri II Vsevolodovich's troops and killed him, continued their march, and in the Vyatichi lands they came upon the town of Kozelsk, and they struggled 7 weeks to crush it. Archaeological evidence reveals that Mikhail's domains of Mosalsk and Serensk suffered the same fate.

The second phase of the Mongol invasion began early in 1239; on March 3 one contingent took Pereyaslavl and set fire to it. Not long after Pereyaslavl fell, it would appear, Mikhail went to Kamenets, and organized a general evacuation of his retinue from Kiev. However, Yaroslav Vsevolodovich in Suzdalia got word of his destination; he besieged Kamenets, captured Mikhail's wife, and seized much booty, but Mikhail escaped and returned to Kiev. When Daniil Romanovich learnt that his sister (Mikhail's wife) was being held captive, he asked Yaroslav Vsevolodovich to send her to him.

In the autumn of 1239, the Mongols, who had occupied Chernihiv on October 18, sent messengers to Kiev proposing peace, but Mikhail refused to submit. During the first half of 1240, we are told, Batu Khan sent Möngke to reconnoiter Kiev; when his messengers came to Mikhail for the second time seeking to coax him into submitting, he defied the khan by putting his envoys to deaths. The forces in Rus' on whom Mikhail could still rely were his own druzhina and the Kievan militia, and therefore he fled to Hungary.

In the chaos that preceded the invasion of the west bank of the river Dnieper, minor princelings and boyars took advantage of the opportunities that presented themselves to seize power: Rostislav Mstislavich seized Kiev, but he was evicted by Daniil Romanovich.

Meanwhile, Mikhail had arrived in Hungary where he attempted to arrange a marriage for his son Rostislav Mikhailovich with the king's daughter. In the light of Mikhail's plight, Béla IV saw no advantage to forming such an alliance and evicted Mikhail and his son from Hungary. In Mazovia, Mikhail received a warm welcome from his uncle, but he decided that the expedient course of action was to seek reconciliation and sent envoys to his brother-in-law. Mikhail pledged never again to antagonize Daniil Romanovich and forswore making any future attempts on Halych. Daniil Romanovich invited him to Volhynia, returned his wife, and relinquished control of Kiev. In the face of the Mongol attack, however, Mikhail did not return to Kiev but allowed his brother-in-law's men to remain there.

Towards the end of 1240, Batu Khan encircled Kiev with his troops, and the town fell on December 6. On learning Kiev's fate, Mikhail withdrew from Volhynia and for the second time imposed himself on his maternal uncle's good graces. When, however, the Mongols also threatened Mazovia, he traveled west to Wrocław in Silesia. As his caravan pressed northwest, it came to Środa, where the local inhabitants attacked Mikhail's train; they plundered his goods and killed a number of his people including his granddaughter. The Mongols invaded Silesia, and after the invaders had passed through Volhynia and the Polish lands, Mikhail returned to Mazovia.

Final years
Some time in the spring of 1241, he considered it safe to go home. He stopped at the devastated town of Volodymyr, rode northeast to Pinsk, and then traveled down the river Pripyat to Kiev. Unable to return to his court on the citadel because Batu Khan's official had presumably occupied it, he took up residence on an island near the Podil (Old Kyiv was razed). Significantly, Batu Khan's man did not challenge his arrival thereby indicating that the Mongols were willing to let refugee princes return to their ravaged towns without obstruction.

On learning that Béla IV had given his daughter in marriage to his son, Rostislav Mikhailovich (who had fled to the Hungarians) in 1242, Mikhail believed that his efforts to form an alliance with the Árpád dynasty had finally been realized. He therefore rode to Hungary expecting to negotiate the agreements that normally accompanied such an alliance. However, his hopes were dashed: the king and his son rebuffed him when he came to the king's court. Mikhail, greatly angered by his son, returned empty-handed to Chernihiv.

Meanwhile, Batu Khan commanded all the princes to visit Sarai and pay him homage. Prince Yaroslav Vsevolodovich of Suzdal was the first to respond to the summons: at the beginning of 1243, he traveled to Sarai, where Batu Khan appointed him senior prince in Rus'. After returning to Suzdal, he sent his commander to rule Kiev. Accordingly, some time during the second part of that year, Mikhail abandoned his court on the island below Kiev and returned to Chernihiv. But even there his authority was insecure: like all the other princes of Rus', he had to obtain Batu Khan's patent (yarlik) to rule his patrimony.

Martyrdom and cult

By the end of 1245, only Mikhail from among the three senior princes had not yet kowtowed to the conqueror. In the end, Mikhail went in time to pre-empt a Mongol punitive strike against his domain; his grandson, Boris Vasilkovich of Rostov accompanied him.

When they arrived at Saray, Batu Khan sent messengers to Mikhail's camp instructing him to worship according to the laws of the Mongols by bowing to the fires and idols. Mikhail agreed to bow to the khan, but he insulted the Mongol by refusing to obey his command to worship idols. Enraged by the prince's retort, Batu Khan ordered that he be put to death. He was slaughtered by Doman of Putivls, and Fedor his boyar was killed after him. The Novgorod First Chronicle, the oldest chronicle reporting his death narrates that their bodies were thrown to the dogs; but as a sign of divine favor, their bodies remained unmolested and pillars of fire hovered over them.

The chronicle narrative accounts show that the people of Rus' acknowledged Mikhail and Fedor as martyrs immediately after their deaths. Accordingly, their bodies were later brought to Chernihiv and entombed in a side-chapel dedicated to them (The Miracle-Workers of Chernigov) in the Holy Saviour Cathedral.

His wife survived him and promoted his cult. His daughter Maria and her sons, Boris and Gleb Vasilkovich, inaugurated the Feast of the Miracle-Workers of Chernigov, on September 20, and built a church in their honor. Her sister, Feodula who had become the nun Evfrosinia also advanced his cult to judge from a 17th-century account which reports the existence of a wooden chapel in Suzdal dedicated to them.

The cult was approved in 1547. When Chernihiv was occupied by the Poles in 1578, Ivan IV the Terrible had the relics of the two saints taken to Moscow, where they were placed in the cathedral of Saint Michael the Archangel. In times of oppressions particularly, these martyrs have been regarded by the Russians as their special representatives before God.

Marriage and children
Michael married once and had several children, though the existence of the last four children in the list below is disputed.
Elena Romanovna (or Maria Romanovna) (m. 1210 or 1211), a daughter of prince Roman Mstislavich of Halych and his wife, Predslava Rurikovna of Kiev
Feodula Mikhailovna (1212 – 1250); became a nun and adopted the religious name Evfrosinia;
Duke Rostislav Mikhailovich of Macsó (b. c. 1225 – 1262);
Maria Mikhailovna (? – 7 or 9 December 1271), wife of Prince Vasilko Konstantinovich of Rostov;
Prince Roman Mikhailovich of Chernigov and Bryansk (c. 1218 – after 1288/1305);
Prince Mstislav Mikhailovich of Karachev and Zvenigorod (1220 – 1280);
Prince Simeon Mikhailovich of Glukhov and Novosil;
Prince Yury Mikhailovich of Torusa and Bryansk.

Ancestors

His descendants
In the second half of the 19th century, many family branches stemming from Mikhail flourished: the Baryatinsky, the Gorchakovy, the Dolgorukie, the Eletskie, the Zvenigorodskie, the Koltsovy-Mosalskie, the Obolenskie, the Odoevskie, and the Shcherbatovy.

Nicolas Baumgarten in his Généalogies et mariages occidentaux des Rurikides russes du Xe au XIIIe siècle includes the following important appendix with regard to Mikhail's alleged descendants. Essentially, the four princes—Roman, Simeon, Mstislav, and Iurii (Yury)—claimed in most published genealogies past and present (Dolgorukov, Vlas'ev, Ikonnikov, Ferrand, Dumin & Grebel'skii, etc.) as his sons and as the progenitors of numerous Russian princely families are apparently not to be found in any original historical document, appearing for the first time in the genealogies composed—or more likely contrived—in the 16th century, which witnessed a spate of fanciful genealogical aspirations among European royal and noble families (the Habsburgs claimed descent from Julius Caesar's cousin Sextus (among others); the Bagratids of Georgia, from the biblical King David; the, from cousins of the Virgin Mary; and the Muscovite tsars, from Augustus Caesar, to name but a few):

Footnotes

Sources
Dimnik, Martin: The Dynasty of Chernigov - 1146-1246; Cambridge University Press, 2003, Cambridge; .
DiPlano Carpini, Giovanni (Author) - Hildinger, Erik (Translator): The Story of the Mongols whom We Call the Tartars; Branden Publishing Company, Inc, 1996, Boston, MA; .
Thurston, Herbert, S.J. (Editor): Butler's Lives of the Saints - September; Burns & Oates / Search Press Limited, 1999; .
Vernadsky, George: Kievan Russia; Yale University Press, 1948, New Haven and London; .
Baumgarten, Nicolas. Généalogies et mariages occidentaux des Rurikides russes du Xe au XIIIe siècle. Orientalia christiana 9, no. 35 (1927).

 

1180s births
1246 deaths
13th-century murdered monarchs
Murdered Russian monarchs
Olgovichi family
Grand Princes of Kiev
Princes of Chernigov
Princes of Halych
Princes of Novgorod
Russian saints
Ukrainian saints
Eastern Orthodox monarchs
13th-century Christian saints
13th-century Eastern Orthodox martyrs
13th-century princes in Kievan Rus'
People executed by the Golden Horde
Year of birth uncertain